Tongjŏngho station is a railway station in T'ongch'ŏn county, Kangwŏn province, North Korea on the Kŭmgangsan Ch'ŏngnyŏn Line of the Korean State Railway.

History

The station, originally called Chadong station was opened on 1 September 1929 by the Chosen Government Railway, along with the rest of the first section of the original Tonghae Pukpu Line from Anbyŏn to Hŭpkok.

References

Railway stations in North Korea